The Wonderful Story of Henry Sugar is an upcoming American adventure comedy film written, produced and directed by Wes Anderson. Based on the eponymous short story contained in the 1977 collection The Wonderful Story of Henry Sugar and Six More by Roald Dahl, the second film adaptation of a Dahl work directed by Anderson, after Fantastic Mr. Fox in 2009. The film stars Benedict Cumberbatch as the titular character alongside Ralph Fiennes, Dev Patel, Ben Kingsley, Rupert Friend, and Richard Ayoade. It is scheduled to be released in 2023 on Netflix.

Premise
The film is divided into three chapters. The character of Henry Sugar will serve as a connective thread through each one.

Cast
 Benedict Cumberbatch as Henry Sugar
 Ralph Fiennes
 Dev Patel
 Ben Kingsley
 Rupert Friend
 Richard Ayoade

Production
In September 2021, Netflix acquired the Roald Dahl Story Company for $686 million. The Wonderful Story of Henry Sugar project was confirmed on January 7, 2022, the day after it was reported that Wes Anderson was set to write and direct an adaptation of the Roald Dahl short story with Netflix distributing. It was announced that Benedict Cumberbatch would star as Sugar, with Ralph Fiennes, Dev Patel, and Ben Kingsley joining the cast. Rupert Friend and Richard Ayoade were later added to the cast. Filming began on January 14, 2022 in London.

References

External links
 

Upcoming films
2023 films
Films shot in London
American adventure comedy films
Films directed by Wes Anderson
Upcoming Netflix original films
Films based on short fiction
Films based on works by Roald Dahl